The 68th Composite Wing was a United States Army Air Forces organization.  It was a command and control organization of Fourteenth Air Force that fought in the China Burma India Theater of World War II.

The wing was formed as an expansion of the Fourteenth Air Force Forward Echelon in 1943, becoming the command and control organization for the 23d Fighter Group and 308th Bomb Group. It served in combat from December 1943 until August 1945.  The mixed unit was composed of fighters, fighter bombers and heavy bombers, flown by both American and Chinese airmen.

History

Lineage
 Constituted as 68th Fighter Wing on 9 August 1943.
 Activated on 3 September 1943.
 Redesignated 68th Composite Wing in December 1943.
 Inactivated on 10 October 1945.

Assignments
 Fourteenth Air Force, 3 September 1943 – 10 October 1945

Stations
 Kunming Airport, China, 3 September 1943
 Kweilin Airfield, China, c. 23 December 1943
 Liuzhou Airfield, China, c. 15 September 1944
 Luliang Airfield, China, c. 7 November 1944
 Peishiyi Airfield, China, c. 19 September-10 October 1945

Components
 23d Fighter Group August 1943 – October 1945 (P-40, P-51)
 308th Bombardment Group March 1943 – February 1945 (B-24)

References

 Maurer, Maurer (1983). Air Force Combat Units Of World War II. Maxwell AFB, Alabama: Office of Air Force History. .

External links

068